The following is a list of schools that participate in NCAA Division II baseball.

Conference affiliations are current for the 2023 baseball season.

Division II programs

Future D-II programs

See also
 List of NCAA Division I baseball programs
 List of NCAA Division II institutions

References

Programs
NCAA Division II programs
baseball programs
NCAA Division II